Swaffham Town Football Club is a football club based in Swaffham, Norfolk, England. They are affiliated to the Norfolk County FA.

History
The club was established in 1892, reaching the final of the Norfolk Junior Cup two years later. In 1935 they joined the Norfolk & Suffolk League, but left after a single season. They won the Norfolk Junior Cup in 1951 and again the following season. In 1959 they moved to the Shoemakers Lane ground, having purchased the site for £250.

The club joined the Anglian Combination and won Division Two in 1973–74. In 1990 they were promoted to Division One of the Eastern Counties League. After winning the division in 2001–02 they were promoted to the Premier Division. However, they finished bottom of the Premier Division in their first season, and were relegated back to Division One. The club remained in Division One until the end of the 2014–15 season, when they were promoted after finishing as runners-up.

In 2016–17 Swaffham finished bottom of the Premier Division, and were relegated to Division One. They were moved to Division One North as part of league reorganisation in 2018, and went on to win the Division One North title in 2018–19, earning promotion back to the Premier Division.

Honours
Eastern Counties League
Division One champions 2000–01
Division One North champions 2018–19
Anglian Combination
Division Two champions 1973–74
Norfolk Junior Cup
Winners 1950–51, 1951–52

Records
Best FA Vase performance: Third round, 2018–19
Attendance: 250 vs Downham Town, Eastern Counties League Cup, 3 September 1991

References

External links
Club website

Swaffham
Association football clubs established in 1892
Football clubs in England
Football clubs in Norfolk
1892 establishments in England
Norfolk & Suffolk League
Anglian Combination
Eastern Counties Football League